Fleishman can refer to :

People
Alfred Fleishman (1905–2002), co-founder of FleishmanHillard
Edwin A. Fleishman (born 1927), American psychologist best known for devising a taxonomy for describing individual differences in perceptual-motor performance
Jerry Fleishman (born 1922), American former professional basketball player
Veniamin Fleishman (1913–1941), Russian composer
Zack Fleishman (born 1980), American tennis player

See also
FleishmanHillard, one of the world's largest public relations agencies.
Fleishman Is in Trouble (miniseries), an American drama streaming television miniseries that premiered in 2022.
Fleischmann (disambiguation)